In electronics, TO-18 is a designation for a style of transistor metal case. The case is more expensive than the similarly sized plastic TO-92 package. The name is from  JEDEC, signifying Transistor Outline Package, Case Style 18.

Construction and orientation
The tab is located 45° from pin 1, which is typically the emitter. The lead diameter is nominally .

Different manufacturers have different tolerances, and the actual form factor may vary slightly, depending on function.

Uses and variants

The 3-lead TO-18 is used for transistors and other devices using no more than three leads. Variants for diodes, photodiodes and LEDs may have only two leads. Light-sensitive or light-emitting devices have a transparent window, lens, or parabolic reflectors in the top of the case rather than a sealed, flat top. For example, diode lasers such as those found in CD players may be packaged in TO-18 cases with a lens.

There are variants with between 2 and 8 leads.

TO-46 / TO-52
The TO-46 and TO-52 packages have 3 leads. These packages differ from all other variants in the height of the cap.

TO-72
The package with 4 leads but otherwise with dimensions identical to TO-18, is standardized as TO-72. The fourth wire is typically connected to the metal case as a means of electromagnetic shielding for radio frequency applications.

TO-71
The TO-71 package has 8 leads (up to three of those may be omitted). The minimum angle between two adjacent leads is 45°.

TO-206
The different outlines are now defined as variants of TO-206: TO-18 is renamed to TO-206-AA, TO-46 to TO-206-AB, TO-52 to TO-206-AC, TO-72 to TO-206-AF. TO-206-AE does not require a minimum diameter of the leads but is otherwise identical to TO-18. The somewhat unrelated TO-58 package is included as TO-206-AG.

National standards

See also
 Common transistors in a TO-18 package: 2N2222, BC108 family
 Common integrated circuits in a TO-18 package: ZN414

References

External links

 TO-18 Package, EESemi.com

Semiconductor packages